Flinders Island is an extinct Australian Aboriginal language spoken off the coast of Queensland, Australia. It is unconfirmed as a distinct language. The inhabitants of the island were the Aba Yalgayi.

One of the last known speakers of the language was Johnny Flinders.

Names 
The name Biyalgeyi have been used, but there is no evidence it refers to a language. Yalgawarra is a clan name.

Notes

Citations

Sources

Extinct languages of Queensland
Indigenous Australian languages in Queensland
Languages extinct in the 2000s
Paman languages